Warren Dexter Niederhauser (January 2, 1918 – January 23, 2005) was an American chemist who was the President of the American Chemical Society (ACS). He worked at of Rohm and Haas chemical company from 1943 to 1985.

Early life and education
Niederhauser was born in Akron, Ohio and grew up in Gadsden, Alabama. He received a B.S. in chemistry from Oberlin College and Ph.D. in organic chemistry from the University of Wisconsin, Madison (1942).

Career

Rohm and Haas
Upon graduation, Niederhauser joined Rohm & Haas as head of the surfactant group in 1943. He would work with the company in various positions until his retirement in early 1990s. As an industrial chemist, he held more than 50 patents.

American Chemical Society presidency
Niederhauser became ACS member in 1942 and began serving as the American Chemical Society national director in 1976 and after seven years ran for the presidency in 1984. During the campaign, his opponent F. Albert Cotton caused a controversy by mailing a letter to selected members describing Niederhauser as "a mediocre industrial chemist".

As the president of ACS, he promoted programs that would increase the professional value of chemists. He urged ACS to take a more active role in monitoring federal research funding plans and supported tax incentives for R&D. He also encouraged industry accountability by publishing the records of employers that flout ACS guidelines.

Membership and honors
He was a member of the Philadelphia Organic Chemists' Club, the American Institute of Chemists, the Society of Chemical Industry, and the American Association for the Advancement of Science.

In 1985, he received the Henry Hill Award.

Works

Death
Niederhauser died on 23 January 2005, at the age of 87.

References

1918 births
2005 deaths
20th-century American chemists
Oberlin College alumni
University of Wisconsin alumni
Presidents of the American Chemical Society
Fellows of the American Association for the Advancement of Science
People from Akron, Ohio